William Henry Wescott (September 1, 1922 – February 25, 2016) was a United States Air Force flying ace of the Korean War, credited with shooting down five enemy aircraft.

See also
List of Korean War flying aces

References

Sources

1922 births
2016 deaths
American Korean War flying aces
Military personnel from Milwaukee
Recipients of the Distinguished Flying Cross (United States)
Recipients of the Silver Star
United States Air Force officers
United States Army Air Forces pilots of World War II